Jaan Teetsov (20 February 1884 Penuja Parish (now Mulgi Parish), Kreis Pernau – 8 February 1942 Sverdlovsk Oblast, Russia) was an Estonian politician. He was a member of II Riigikogu.

References

1884 births
1942 deaths
People from Mulgi Parish
People from Kreis Pernau
Farmers' Assemblies politicians
Members of the Riigikogu, 1923–1926
Members of the Riigikogu, 1926–1929
Members of the Riigikogu, 1929–1932
Estonian people who died in Soviet detention
People who died in the Gulag